The Scholze–Sayles House is a historic house in Pawtucket, Rhode Island.  It is a -story wood-frame structure, built in 1874–75.  It is one of two (the other is the nearby Louis Kotzow House) built by the German Land Cooperative Association, which sought to create a German-speaking enclave in the area.  This house is a fine example of Gothic Revival style, and is stylistically similar to the Kotzow House, with a busy exterior that has numerous projecting and gabled sections, and Stick style decoration on a bay window.  The interior was extensively redone in 1935 in a Federal Revival style by architect Albert Harkness.

The house was listed on the National Register of Historic Places in 1983.

See also
National Register of Historic Places listings in Pawtucket, Rhode Island

References

Houses completed in 1874
Houses on the National Register of Historic Places in Rhode Island
Houses in Pawtucket, Rhode Island
National Register of Historic Places in Pawtucket, Rhode Island